The Babcock-Hart Award has been awarded since 1948 by the Institute of Food Technologists. It is given for significant contributions in food technology that resulted in public health through some aspects of nutrition. It was first named the Stephan M. Babcock Award after the agricultural chemist Stephen M. Babcock of the University of Wisconsin–Madison for his "single-grain experiment" of 1907–1911, but renamed the Babcock-Hart Award following the death of Babcock's colleague Edwin B. Hart in 1953.

Award winners receive a plaque from the International Life Sciences Institute-North America, headquartered in Washington, DC and a USD 3000 honorarium.

Winners

References

List of International Life Science Institute Awards, including Babcock-Hart

Food technology awards